Klaus Fischer (born 27 December 1949) is a German former professional footballer and coach. He was a key player on the West Germany national team that lost the 1982 World Cup final to Italy. As a forward, he was noted for his bicycle kicks, and scored a spectacular overhead kick equalizer in extra-time of a 1982 World Cup semi-final against France.

Club career
Fischer was born in Kreuzstraßl, near Lindberg (Bayerischer Wald) in the district of Regen.

He moved from SC Zwiesel to TSV 1860 Munich in 1968 and made 535 Bundesliga appearances for 1860 Munich, FC Schalke 04, 1. FC Köln and VfL Bochum. With Schalke 04 he won the German Cup in 1972. Schalke 04 were one of the clubs involved in a bribery scandal in season 1970–71 of the Bundesliga. As one of the players involved, Fischer initially received a ban for life, but this punishment was later reduced to a one-year league ban and a five-year ban from national team eligibility.

In 1976, he was top scorer in the Bundesliga. With 268 goals he ranks third to Gerd Müller and Robert Lewandowski on the list of all-time top Bundesliga goalscorers. In 1988 Fischer's club side VfL Bochum made it to the German Cup final, but Fischer did not feature in the final match. He ended his career in 1988.

His 182 league goals for Schalke 04 remain a club record.

International career
Fischer made 45 appearances for the West Germany national team from 1977 to 1982, scoring 32 goals (eight headers and 24 with his feet, including two bicycle kicks). He appeared in two World Cups and was a World Cup runner-up in Spain in 1982.

Fischer was known particularly for his bicycle kicks, often set up for him by Rüdiger Abramczik. His goal from a bicycle kick in a 4–1 win in a 1977 international match against Switzerland was selected as the Goal of the Year by German television viewers. It would later be voted Goal of the Decade and Goal of the Century. He also scored a famous bicycle kick equalizer in extra time in a 1982 World Cup semi-final against France, which West Germany went on to win on penalties.

Coaching career
Fischer runs a football training school.

Career statistics

Club

International

Honours
Schalke 04
 DFB-Pokal: 1971–72

1. FC Köln
 DFB-Pokal: 1982–83

West Germany
 FIFA World Cup runner-up: 1982

Individual
 Bundesliga top scorer: 1975–76 (29 goals)
 Goal of the Year (Germany): 1977
 Goal of the Decade (Germany)
 Goal of the Century (Germany)
 kicker Bundesliga Team of the Season: 1984–85

References

1949 births
Living people
People from Regen (district)
Sportspeople from Lower Bavaria
German footballers
Association football forwards
Germany international footballers
Germany under-21 international footballers
1978 FIFA World Cup players
1982 FIFA World Cup players
Bundesliga players
Kicker-Torjägerkanone Award winners
TSV 1860 Munich players
FC Schalke 04 players
1. FC Köln players
VfL Bochum players
FC Schalke 04 managers
Footballers from Bavaria
German football managers
West German footballers